Sheila Surban (born Sheila Jane Y. Surban, December 9, 1985, in Iligan City, Philippines) is a singer and songwriter from the Philippines.

Career 
She is the first Filipina participant of Piirpauke. Both her parents are natural-born Filipino citizens. She started singing since she was 7 years old at a church in Philippines. During her teen years, she began her singing career when one of her teachers in school asked her to sing on TV called the "Campus Beat", A TV program for schools in Iligan City, courtesy of Southern Cable TV. She participated in any events that involves singing throughout the time she was in high school. By the time she turned 18, she decided she was ready to join a band. And she did find the perfect band that suits her singing needs. She sang with her band in many venues including the time when they were hired to perform after the well-known Philippine singers like Vina Morales and Aiza Seguerra performing in concert at Sports Center in Baruy. While Sheila Surban was in the band she also performs in a well-known hotel in Iligan City with the piano player she met when she was singing at her friend's birthday. In June 2005, she joined a singing contest for the first time in Iligan City Public Plaza and sang her most favorite singer Mariah Carey's song called "HERO" and was awarded as "Star of the Night" and won the contest.

Sheila Surban used to sing mostly pop and RnB type of music but as soon she moved to Finland in May 2006, she began working with Sakari Kukko, the founding member of Piirpauke, a band that is famous for playing world music. She performed with them in Tallinn, Estonia in June 2006. She also performed in Joensuu Gospel Festival in July 2006. After that, she embarked on singing gospel songs in most of the churches around Finland but still keep performing Finnish folk music.

In June 2009, she made an album with Sakari Kukko and Samuli Mikkonen called "Soi Kiitos", courtesy of Rockadillo Records. They received a lot of the good critics about their album in the newspaper around Finland. Their album was announced in Radio Dei, a Finnish radio station, as the "ALBUM OF THE WEEK", that earned them to have their songs of their album played for one week in that radio station.

Sheila Surban joined a new group called "Intercontinental Trio", a band consisting of musicians from three continents, Asia, Europe and Africa, the music of which predominantly represents the genre of world music. Sakari Kukko and Ismaila Sane are two of the members of the band.

She also joined Sakari Kukko's Humbalax band with multiracial members but the name itself is based on Humppa (a Finnish traditional dance music) and Balax (a modern Senegalese dance music) and that is how the name of the band was created. She is currently recording a new album with the group and it is available in the market last November 2011.

She made a live TV performance singing "Cannot Forget You" with other members of Humbalax in Iiro Rantala & Minna Pensola +  program which was aired on YLE Teema, one of Finland's national TV channel.

Discography 
 "Soi Kiitos (2009)"
 "Paratiisi (2011)"
 "Ilo (2012)"
 "JouLumo (2017)"
 "Hali (2019)"

External links
  A short Finnish Biography of Sheila Surban in Sommelo
 Information about the Soi Kiitos album
 Helsingin Sanomat article about Soi Kiitos Album
 Topics related to Sheila Surban
 Video Resources of Sheila Surban in the net

Notes 
 Paratiisi album review in finnish by Kansan Uutiset
 Paratiisi album review in finnish by Soundi Magazine
 Paratiisi album review in finnish by Keskisuomalainen
 Paratiisi album review in finnish by Keskisuomalainen
 Paratiisi album review in swedish by HBL
 Rockadillo Records' Humbalax Artist page

1985 births
Living people
People from Iligan
Filipino songwriters
Filipino singer-songwriters
21st-century Filipino women singers